Albert Van de Vliet (born 15 July 1917, date of death unknown) was a Belgian sprint canoer who competed in the late 1940s and early 1950s. Competing in two Summer Olympics, he was eliminated in the heats of the K-2 1000 m event at both 1948 and 1952.

References
Albert Van de Vliet's profile at Sports Reference.com

1917 births
Belgian male canoeists
Canoeists at the 1948 Summer Olympics
Canoeists at the 1952 Summer Olympics
Olympic canoeists of Belgium
Year of death missing